Oneli M. Pérez Garcia (born May 26, 1983) is a Dominican professional baseball player.

Biography
Pérez was born in Bonao, Dominican Republic.

He was undrafted and was signed by the Chicago White Sox as a free agent on May 19, 2004 by fellow Dominican Denny González.

In January 2011, he accepted an offer to play with Hanwha Eagles in the Korea Baseball Organization, but was released in June later that year.
Since then, he joined the Mexican team Sultanes de Monterrey on a recommendation from his former Hanhwa team-mate Karim García who had previously spent a short spell at the team.

References

External links

1983 births
Dominican Republic baseball players
Dominican Republic expatriate baseball players in South Korea
Dominican Republic expatriate baseball players in the United States
Living people
People from Bonao
Hanwha Eagles players
Kannapolis Intimidators players
Winston-Salem Warthogs players
Birmingham Barons players
Trenton Thunder players
Charlotte Knights players
Buffalo Bisons (minor league) players
Newark Bears players
Memphis Redbirds players